Hardball is a 2001 American sports drama/comedy film directed by Brian Robbins and starring Keanu Reeves in the main role, Diane Lane and D. B. Sweeney. The screenplay by John Gatins is based on the book Hardball: A Season in the Projects by Daniel Coyle. The original music score is composed by Mark Isham. The film was released on September 14, 2001, topping the box office the weekend after the September 11 attacks.

Plot
Conor O'Neill is a gambler who secretly bets $6,000 on his dead father's account and is now severely in debt with two bookies. In order to repay the debts, he is told by a corporate friend that he must coach a baseball team of troubled African-American fifth grade kids from Chicago's ABLA housing projects in exchange for $500 each week, for ten weeks.

Worried only about getting his $500 check, Conor shows up at the baseball field to a rag tag bunch of trash-talking, street-wise, inner city kids who live in the projects. Some of the players include: Andre Ray Peetes, a smart-mouthed jokester, captain of the team who knows about all the players and forms a strong bond with Conor; Kofi Evans, a troubled, angry boy who has a rivalry with Andre, a quick temper, but is the best player on the team; Jefferson Albert Tibbs, a sweet, overweight, asthmatic player; Jamal, Andre's best friend and the oldest on the team; Miles Penfield II, the brilliant pitcher who listens to The Notorious B.I.G.’s Big Poppa to pitch well; and Jarius "G-Baby" Evans, Kofi's much younger brother who is too young to play so he becomes Conor's assistant.

Conor's efforts are hindered from the onset by the fact that he does not have nine kids to make up the team—Jamal’s mother altered his birth certificate to be younger and G-Baby is sad because he is far too young to play. The older kids tell Conor it is because their teacher, Elizabeth "Sister" Wilkes, is making several boys finish a book report. Conor visits the teacher, but his life is threatened repeatedly by his bookies for not paying his gambling debts. He is visited by the mother of two boys and her sister's son that are allowed to play in exchange for him tutoring them.

Conor works to get the team to support each other and stop trash-talking each other's bad plays; but the team nevertheless loses its first game 16–1, which fosters hostility between the players. Conor brings them together by buying them pizza (trading sports tickets for the pizza) and leads the team to win their second game 9–3. The team starts to come together as Conor tries to kindle a romance with Wilkes.

Conor risks everything and makes a $12,000 bet with a new bookie to cover the $12,000 debt he owes to the other bookies. His stress, already high from his gambling debts, runs higher at the baseball field because Jamal is pulled from playing after a competing coach questions the boy's age and Myles can't wear headphones while he pitches. Conor takes offense to the league president's threat to be removed, after he voices his objection to his team having to wear ratty T-shirts while the other teams have full uniforms. In protest, he announces it was his last game which draws dissension and resentment from his players.

Conor barely wins his $12,000 bet, pays off all his debts, and refuses to turn that bet for $24,000 using the winnings. Conor connects with the kids and finds it harder to leave than he thought. He surprises them with second row seats (behind Sammy Sosa's dugout) to a major league game. He stops gambling; his relationship with Wilkes grows; he gets new uniforms for the players (sponsored by one of his bookies); and he assumes a fatherly role in leading the team to the championship game (called "going to the 'ship" by the boys).

Just after Conor drops the kids off at home after winning the pre-championship game, G-Baby is struck and killed by a stray bullet and Kofi has to hold him as he dies. Conor wants to forfeit the game, but Andre and especially Kofi, rallies the team together. The end credits show the kids finally getting the trophies they wanted after winning the championship.

Cast

Music

Soundtrack

A soundtrack containing hip hop and R&B music was released on September 11, 2001 by Columbia Records. It peaked at #55 on the Billboard 200 and #34 on the Top R&B/Hip-Hop Albums.

Reception

Box office
The film topped the box office by grossing $10.1 million on its opening weekend, which came shortly after the September 11 attacks. Worldwide it grossed $44.1 million The film at No. 2 at the box office that weekend was The Glass House which also starred Diane Lane.

Critical response
On review aggregation website Rotten Tomatoes, the film holds an approval rating of 41% based on 113 reviews, with an average rating of 4.72/10. The site's critical consensus reads, "Although Hardball contains some touching moments, they are not enough to transcend the sports formula." On Metacritic, which assigns a normalized rating to reviews, the film has a weighted average score of 48 out of 100, based on 25 critics, indicating "mixed or average reviews". Audiences polled by CinemaScore gave the film an average grade of "A−" on an A+ to F scale.

See also

List of sports films
List of drama films
 List of hood films

References

External links

 
 
 
 

2001 films
2000s sports comedy-drama films
American sports comedy-drama films
American baseball films
Hood films
Paramount Pictures films
Films directed by Brian Robbins
Fireworks Entertainment films
Films scored by Mark Isham
Films with screenplays by John Gatins
Films about alcoholism 
Films shot in Detroit
Impact of the September 11 attacks on cinema
2000s English-language films
2000s American films